State Route 150 (SR 150) is a  state highway that connects the Birmingham suburbs of Bessemer and Hoover in Jefferson County in the central part of the U.S. state of Alabama. The western terminus of the highway is at an intersection with U.S. Route 11 (US 11) and SR 5 in Bessemer. The eastern terminus of the highway is at an intersection with US 31 in Hoover.

Route description

Since the 1980s, many commercial developments have been built along SR 150 in Hoover. Several large retail developments, including the Riverchase Galleria and the Patton Creek shopping center, are located along or adjoining to this route. Hunter Street Baptist Church, one of the largest churches in Alabama, is located on this highway. The Hoover Metropolitan Stadium, formerly known as Regions Park, is accessible via the highway, as are the Oxmoor Valley course of the Robert Trent Jones Golf Trail and the Ross Bridge Golf Resort and Spa.

In Hoover, SR 150 has been designated as John Hawkins Parkway, in honor of the late Alabama state legislator who represented the city and southern Jefferson County. In Bessemer, SR 150 is referred to as 14th Street.

History
Before 1984, SR 150 was a two-lane highway from the Bessemer city limits to Hoover. However, residential, commercial, and institutional growth has led to the city of Hoover widening the highway from US 31 to I-459.

Future
Future plans call for widening the entire highway, from Bessemer to Hoover, to five lanes.

Major intersections

See also

References

150
Transportation in Jefferson County, Alabama
Bessemer, Alabama
Hoover, Alabama